Stade Ahmed Bsiri is a stadium in Bizerte, Tunisia. It has a capacity of 2,000 spectators.  It was the home of Club Athlétique Bizertin of the Tunisian Ligue Professionnelle 1 until Stade 15 Octobre opened in 1985.  During the 1965 Africa Cup of Nations, it hosted one match.

References

Football venues in Tunisia
Bizerte